Cleven is both a surname and a given name. Notable people with the name include:

Endre Johannes Cleven (1874–1916), Norwegian-born Canadian classical musician and military officer
Cleven "Goodie" Goudeau, American art director and cartoonist

Places
Chiavenna, Italy, which is sometimes known as Cleven in German

See also
Clevens Loch, Ayrshire, former loch in South Ayrshire, Scotland
Kleven (disambiguation)

Masculine given names